Emperor Yin (隱帝, Yindi) may refer to:

Liu Can (died 318), Emperor Yin of Han Zhao
Liu Chengyou (931–951), Emperor Yin of Later Han